Matthew Joseph "Matt" Birong Jr. is an American chef and politician who has represented the Addison-3 Vermont Representative District alongside Diane Lanpher in the Vermont House of Representatives since 2019 as a member of the Democratic Party.

Early life 
Birong was born on May 23, 1977, in Burlington, Vermont to Matthew Joseph Birong Sr. and Catherine Mary McNamara, both natives of New York City. He is of mixed Hungarian and Irish descent from his father and mother respectively. He was raised in the town of Essex, Vermont. Birong attended the New England Culinary Institute and graduated with a degree in Culinary Arts, becoming a professional chef and, according to his official government biography, having worked for over 20 years in establishments located in Manhattan, Boston, and his home city of Burlington.

Personal life 
Birong lives with his wife Danelle Lello Birong and their dog Luna at their residence in Vergennes, Vermont.

References 

1977 births
Living people
Democratic Party members of the Vermont House of Representatives